Samson Ryan (born 9  December 2000) is a professional Australian rules footballer who plays for the Richmond Football Club in the Australian Football League (AFL).

Early life, junior football and state-league football
Ryan grew up in Pambula, a coastal town on New South Wales' far south coast. He played football with the Pambula Panthers and the Merimbula in the Sapphire Coast Australian Football League as well as cricket in his pre-teen years, before focusing on cricket in his early teen years. Around that time, he was offered a cricket scholarship to Toowoomba Grammar School, prompting his family to move to Queensland to accept the scholarship.

Ryan returned to football while in Toowoomba and became an impressive prospect, joining the Brisbane Lions Academy program and later representing Queensland at the Under 17 National Championships in 2018.

Ryan played representative football with the Lions Academy side in the 2019 NAB League Boys season, and was named by Aussie Rules Draft Central as the best performed ruck of any of the five competing Academies, after averaging 26 hitouts a game across five matches. That same year, he represented Queensland as part of Allies side at the 2019 AFL Under 18 Championships. In the later part of the season, Ryan played QAFL football with Sherwood Districts and later made his NEAFL debut with Redland.

Though part of the Lions' academy, the club was not given priority access to match any other club's bid on Ryan at the 2019 AFL national draft owing to his relatively late move to Queensland. In any case he was eventually passed over by all 18 clubs.

Ryan intended to return to state-league football in 2020, initially signing with the Canberra Football Club but ultimately being unable to play at the level after the NEAFL season was cancelled as a result of state border closures associated with the COVID-19 pandemic. He returned instead to Sherwood in the QAFL, where he played 10 matches as the club's lead ruck.

Junior statistics

NAB League Boys

|- style="background-color: #EAEAEA"
! scope="row" style="text-align:center" | 2019
|Brisbane Lions
| 60 || 5 || 0 || — || 29 || 23 || 52 || 10 || 7 || 129 || 0.0 || — || 5.8 || 4.6 || 10.4 || 2.0 || 1.4 || 25.8
|-
|- class="sortbottom"
! colspan=3| Career
! 5
! 0
! —
! 29
! 23
! 52
! 10
! 7
! 129
! 0.0
! —
! 5.8
! 4.6
! 10.4
! 2.0
! 1.4
! 25.8
|}
Under 18 National Championships

|- style="background-color: #EAEAEA"
! scope="row" style="text-align:center" | 2019
|Allies
| 30 || 1 || 0 || — || 1 || 1 || 2 || 0 || 0 || 21 || 0.0 || — || 1.0 || 1.0 || 2.0 || 0.0 || 0.0 || 21.0
|-
|- class="sortbottom"
! colspan=3| Career
! 1
! 0
! —
! 1
! 1
! 2
! 0
! 0
! 21
! 0.0
! —
! 1.0
! 1.0
! 2.0
! 0.0
! 0.0
! 21.0
|}

AFL career

2021 season

He first represented Richmond as part of the club's reserves side, featuring in VFL pre-season matches in March and April before the season officially began in April. Ryan continued to play in VFL matches during the season proper, kicking three goals in the first official match of the season and playing mostly as a forward during this period. After a four-goal performance in late-May and following an injury to lead AFL ruck Toby Nankervis, Ryan was considered for senior selection but eventually passed over for the club's round 12 match against . Instead he was given the role as lead ruck at reserves level and after a COVID-19 outbreak induced three-week bye, impressing in the club's next match wit 30 hit outs and one goal against . Following that match, Ryan was selected to make an AFL debut in round 15's match against  at the MCG. After a poor performance that including just one hitout and no disposals, Ryan was immediately dropped back to reserves level the following week.

Player profile
Ryan plays as a ruck and tall forward. He is notable for his contested marking ability.

AFL statistics
Updated to the end of round 23, 2022.

|-
| scope="row" style="text-align:center" | 2021
|style="text-align:center;"|
| 32 || 1 || 0 || 0 || 0 || 0 || 0 || 0 || 0 || 1 || 0.0 || 0.0 || 0.0 || 0.0 || 0.0 || 0.0 || 0.0 || 1.0
|-
| scope="row" style="text-align:center" | 2022
|style="text-align:center;"|
| 32 || 0 || – || – || – || – || – || – || – || – || – || – || – || – || – || – || – || –
|- class="sortbottom"
! colspan=3| Career
! 1
! 0
! 0
! 0
! 0
! 0
! 0
! 0
! 1
! 0.0
! 0.0
! 0.0
! 0.0
! 0.0
! 0.0
! 0.0
! 1.0
|}

References

External links

Samson Ryan's profile at AFL Draft Central

Living people
2000 births
Richmond Football Club players
Redland Football Club players
Australian rules footballers from Queensland